Danny Morton (born 1 July 1973) is a former Australian rules footballer who played with Fitzroy and Port Adelaide in the Australian Football League (AFL).

Morton, a rover, was drafted to Fitzroy from North Adelaide, with the 70th selection of the 1992 National Draft.

He played just 14 games in his first three seasons at Fitzroy, but put together 16 games in 1996.

In 1997 Morton went back to North Adelaide, but would return to the AFL via the 1997 Draft, with Port Adelaide securing him with pick 41.

When Port Adelaide drew with the Brisbane Lions at the Gabba in round 12 of the 1998 AFL season, Morton would receive two Brownlow Medal votes for his efforts, finishing with 27 disposals and four goals. The following round, while playing against the Western Bulldogs, Morton badly injured his neck when he landed on his head after contesting a mark. His injury required surgery, with the C4 and C5 vertebrae from his neck being fused together using a bone from his hip. He did not play again for the rest of the season or feature in the Port Adelaide team in 1999. In 2000 he returned to the side, and appeared in seven of the first 10 rounds, but then lost his place in the team permanently.

He joined Norwood in 2001.

Later on he decided to teach and then on he became a PE teacher in Adelaide, SA at Tyndale Christian School

References

1973 births
Australian rules footballers from South Australia
Fitzroy Football Club players
Port Adelaide Football Club players
Port Adelaide Football Club players (all competitions)
North Adelaide Football Club players
Norwood Football Club players
Living people